Panapakkam is a panchayat town in Nemili Taluk of  Ranipet district in the Indian state of Tamil Nadu.This town is located about 30 kilometres from Ranipet and  85 kilometres from Chennai. Panapakkam is supposedly one of the hottest towns in India (next to Vellore), where the temperature can exceed 43 °C (110 °F) for several days in peak of the summer.
Petrol pump station
PALANI AGENCIES
BPCL Petrol pump

Demographics
 India census, Panapakkam had a population of 10,142. Males constitute 49% of the population and females 51%. Panapakkam has an average literacy rate of 66%, higher than the national average of 59.5%: male literacy is 75%, and female literacy is 57%. In Panapakkam, 12% of the population is under 6 years of age.

All agriculture land are converting to Flat and Plot System.

Panapakkam is very near Kancheepuram new greenfield Airport.

Location
Panapakkam is about 85 km west of Chennai, 50 km east of Vellore and 18 km west of Kanchipuram and 25 km from Arakkonam.
 Nearest airport: Chennai
 Nearest seaport: Chennai
 Nearest railway station(suburban train) : Tirumalpur (~13 km)
 Nearest railway station(suburban train): Kanchipuram (~18 km)
 Nearest Main railway station(express and local): Arakkonam (~25 km)
 Nearest Police Station : Nemili, Thakkolam, Kaveripakkam -> Ranipet district police

Schools
 Government boys higher secondary school
 Government girls' higher secondary school
 Sri Saraswathi matric. higher secondary school

Politics
Recently the assembly constituency has changed to Sholingur from Arakonam.

The sitting MLA Munirathanam was elected during the 2021 Tamil Nadu assembly election.

The sitting MP S. Jagathrakshakan was elected during the 2019 parliamentary election.

References

Cities and towns in Ranipet district